BFG may refer to:

Arts and entertainment
 The BFG, a 1982 children's book by Roald Dahl
 The BFG (1989 film), an ITV film by Brian Cosgrove
 The BFG (2016 film), a Disney movie by Steven Spielberg
 BFG (weapon), fictional gun in the Doom and Quake games
 Bound for Glory (wrestling pay-per-view)
 Bunchofuckingoofs or the BFGs, a Toronto-based punk band

Military and weapons
 BFG 50,  a Serbu Firearms model of rifle
 British Forces Germany, a 1945–2020 U.K. military presence

Technologies
 BFG (web framework), for the Python programming language
 BFG Technologies, a defunct American manufacturer of graphics cards
 Blast furnace gas, a by-product and synthetic fuel

Other uses
 Bullfrog Basin Airport, Utah, U.S. (by IATA code)
 FIK BFG Fana, a Norwegian athletics club
 Busan Kayan, a lect spoken in Borneo